Kusina Kings is a Philippine comedy film written and directed by Victor Kaiba Villanueva with the film producer Carlo Katigbak the current president of ABS-CBN Corporation. The film starred Zanjoe Marudo and Empoy Marquez, and was released by Star Cinema in the Philippines on July 25, 2018.

Cast

Plot
Two best friends enter a cook off challenge to save their restaurant. Zanjoe Marudo as Ronnie and chef restaurateur Empoy Marquez as Benjie have been best friends since high school. When Benjie decided to put up his own restaurant La Luna Sa Hungry, Ronnie has never left his side especially now that Benjie has joined in the shady "Kusina King Challenge" to save the restaurant. Benjie and Ronnie have a falling out when Ronnie has wrongly given Benjie's startup money for the challenge to a scammer. Things then go out of proportion with Ronnie accidentally placing Benjie in a coma.

References

External links

Filipino-language films
Star Cinema comedy films
Star Cinema films
Cooking films